The women's 50 metre breaststroke event at the 2022 Commonwealth Games will be held on 29 and 30 July at the Sandwell Aquatics Centre.

Records
Prior to this competition, the existing world, Commonwealth and Games records were as follows:

The following records were established during the competition:

Schedule
The schedule is as follows:

All times are British Summer Time (UTC+1)

Results

Heats

Semifinals

Final

References

Women's 50 metre breaststroke
Commonwealth Games